The Katanning Mosque is a mosque in Katanning, Western Australia.

History
The mosque was opened in 1980 after it was built by the local Islamic community who arrived in Katanning in 1974 from Christmas Island and Cocos Islands.
In 1981 it was visited and formally opened by former Prime Minister of Malaysia Tunku Abdul Rahman.
The community and mosque have had interest at different times from Australian media, for understanding of how the community feels about being in an Australian country town.

Architecture
The mosque was constructed with orange bricks and silver minarets.

See also
 Islam in Australia
 List of mosques in Oceania

References

1980 establishments in Australia
Katanning, Western Australia
Mosques completed in 1980
Mosques in Western Australia